Vautin is a surname. Notable people with the surname include:

Charles Vautin (1867–1942), Australian cricketer
George Vautin (1869–1949), Australian rules footballer
Paul Vautin (born 1959), Australian rugby league player, coach, and television presenter

See also
Vautrin (disambiguation)